Andy Smith (born 6 July 1984) is an English former professional rugby league footballer who played as a .

Smith was the first try scorer of the annual magic weekend in 2007.

Background
Smith was born in Wakefield, West Yorkshire, England.

Early career
A former junior player with the Wakefield based Westgate Wolves ARLFC where Smith topped the try scoring list one season with an impressive 87 tries, Smith came into the Bulls Squad midway through the 2001 season after a string of impressive displays in the Bulls Senior Academy side. Smith made great strides last year making twelve appearances as well as having a stint with his old boss Karl Harrison on loan at Salford.

In 2006 Smith was awarded a special prize by the Bulls for finishing Top Try Scorer in the Senior Academy with 27.

Bradford Bulls
Smith turned down a move to Super League rivals Castleford Tigers at the beginning of 2006. Smith told the Bradford Telegraph & Argus: "I'm going to fight my way into the Bulls side."

On 14 November 2006 he signed a one-year deal.

Harlequins RL
On 6 February 2007 Smith signed for Harlequins RL but was released at the end of the season.

It was during this spell in which Smith made history by becoming the first ever player to score at the annual Magic Weekend event.

He was then quickly snapped up by highly ambitious Halifax on 13 October.

Halifax 
Having been released by 'Quins coach Brian McDermott at the end of the 2007 Super League season. Smith joined part-time club Halifax on a one-year contract. Smith left Halifax midway through the 2008 season because of disagreements with senior management.

York City Knights
Smith came out of retirement to play for York City Knights in 2016.

References

External links
 Quins RL profile
 Bradford Profile
 Welcome Andy Smith

1984 births
Living people
Bradford Bulls players
Dewsbury Rams players
English rugby league players
Halifax R.L.F.C. players
London Broncos players
Rochdale Hornets players
Rugby league players from Wakefield
Rugby league wingers
Salford Red Devils players
York City Knights players